Billionaire is a private residence in the Bel Air neighborhood of Los Angeles, California, United States.

History
The previous home occupying the lot was owned by Hollywood star Judy Garland until 1967. The property was acquired by Bruce Makowsky in May 2012, for US$7.9 million. The structure was built in four years by 250 workers.

Price
Listed in January 2017 at US$250 million, Billionaire was the most expensive house listed for sale at that time in the US. In April 2018 it was relisted for $188 million. In January 2019, its price was cut again to $150 million. It surpassed the Gemini mansion in Manalapan, Florida that was listed at $190 million at the time. The most expensive home ever sold in Los Angeles County was the Playboy Mansion at $100 million, while the record sale in the state of California was $117.5 million. At that time, the most expensive home ever sold in the US was a $147 million East Hampton mansion. In October 2019, the house sold for $94 million.

Description
It has 12 bedrooms: two master suites and ten large guest suites. The interior contains 21 bathrooms adorned with 50 types of Italian marble, five bars, three kitchens, three dining areas, a  fitness center, a wellness spa, a 4-lane bowling alley, a $12,000 glass pool table, and a 360-inch TV, likely the largest residential television set. The $2 million, 40-seat Dolby Atmos James Bond-themed theater has a 22-foot screen, 57 speakers, and a 4k projector with 7,000 pre-loaded movies. Situated on a 1.08-acre lot, the exterior of the home features  of outdoor deck space, a $2 million outdoor hydraulic retractable theater screen measuring 18 feet by 12 feet, an 85-foot glass tile infinity pool with a swim-up bar, and a helipad with an inoperable Airwolf replica that the developer calls a "sculpture." The home offers a 270-degree view of Los Angeles from the San Gabriel Mountains to the Pacific Ocean in Malibu.

There are two wine cellars, two commercial elevators lined in alligator skin, a $2 million polished steel staircase, a $500,000 set of moving Seven Dwarfs images, a $200,000 wall of candy dispensers, Dom Pérignon-filled fire extinguishers, over 130 works of art (including photographs by Timothy White and a $1 million sculpture by Liao Yibai), and a seven-person full-time staff with separate living quarters. The residence includes an auto gallery with US$30 million in luxury vehicles, including Lamborghinis, Ferraris, Bentleys, a Rolls-Royce, a Bugatti Veyron, ten motorcycles, a one-of-a-kind Pagani Huayra worth more than $2 million, and a 1936 Mercedes-Benz 540K worth in excess of $15 million.

See also 
 List of largest houses in the Los Angeles metropolitan area
 List of largest houses in the United States

References

Houses in Los Angeles
Bel Air, Los Angeles
Residential buildings completed in 2016